The 1983–84 season was Liverpool Football Club's 92nd season in existence and their 22nd consecutive season in the First Division. It was Liverpool's first season under the management of Joe Fagan, who was promoted from the coaching staff after the retirement of Bob Paisley, their manager of the last nine seasons who had won at least one major trophy in all but the first of his seasons as manager (including six league titles and three European Cups). Fagan's first season as manager ended with Liverpool becoming the first team in England to win three major trophies in the same season as they won the league title, European Cup and League Cup. They beat Roma on penalties to win the European Cup for the fourth time (their sixth European trophy win overall), and defeated Merseyside rivals Everton in the League Cup final replay, and fought off a challenge from the likes of Southampton, Nottingham Forest, Manchester United and Queen's Park Rangers to win their 15th league title, and their third consecutive title.

The undoubted star of the season was striker Ian Rush, who scored 32 goals in the league and 47 in all competitions.	

It was the last season at the club for midfielder Graeme Souness, who was sold to Italian side Sampdoria at the end of the campaign.

Events of the season

August
Bob Paisley, the most successful manager in English football, retired as Liverpool's manager at the end of the 1982–83 season after nine glorious years at the helm. His successor was 62-year-old "boot room" veteran Joe Fagan.

The Fagan era began with the FA Charity Shield at Wembley Stadium on 20 August 1983. Liverpool, defending league champions, lost 2–0 in front of a 92,000 crowd, with Bryan Robson scoring both of the goals for FA Cup winners Manchester United. The league campaign began unspectacularly seven days later with a 1–1 draw at newly promoted Wolverhampton Wanderers.

September
Liverpool's bid for a fourth European Cup triumph began on 14 September with a 1–0 away win in the first round first leg over Danish champions Odense. Qualification for the next stage was confirmed two weeks later when the Reds won 5–0 in the return leg at Anfield.

They had a decent month in the league as well, finishing the month in fourth place behind West Ham United, Manchester United and Southampton.

October
October saw Liverpool's League Cup quest begin in the second round, where they eliminated Third Division Brentford by a comfortable margin. Their European Cup campaign thrown into question with a goalless home draw with Atletico Bilbao of Spain in the second round first leg, leaving them to need at least a score draw in the return leg in order to progress to the quarter-finals. In the league, however, excellent wins over West Ham United and Luton Town helped them to attain second place as the month drew to a close, two points short of leaders Manchester United. As well as the surprise challenge from West Ham United, they also had a race for the title mounting from fellow London side QPR, who like West Ham had never won the title before, but were also playing their first top division season since promotion the previous campaign.

November
November was a rocky month for the Reds. They did manage to dispose of Atletico Bilbao in the European Cup, but were held to two draws by Fulham in the League Cup third round, finally winning the second replay. They did, however, climb to the top of the First Division, though the challenge from West Ham United and Manchester United remained intense, while a surprise challenge was springing from Tottenham Hostpur and unfashionable Luton Town – the latter who had been on the receiving end of a 6–0 demolition (and five goals by Ian Rush) by the Reds a month earlier.

December
10 December 1983 brought one of the most embarrassing defeats ever inflicted on Liverpool Football Club. They travelled to Highfield Road for a First Division clash with a Coventry City side who were emerging as surprise title challengers under young manager Bobby Gould, and found themselves on the receiving end of a 4–0 defeat. However, they pulled together the following weekend to demolish Notts County 5–0 at Anfield, and entered 1984 still in pole position and three points ahead of their nearest rivals Manchester United.

The League Cup quest continued with a replay win over Birmingham City in the fourth round.

January
The first Liverpool game of 1984 was a 1–1 home draw with Manchester United in the league, billed by many as a championship decider – the outcome of which left the top two unchanged. The FA Cup quest began with a 4–0 home win over a Newcastle United led by former Liverpool striker Kevin Keegan, but ended later in the month with a shock 2–0 defeat at the hands of the previous season's losing finalists Brighton & Hove Albion. They also achieved a League Cup quarter-final replay win over Sheffield Wednesday, like Keegan's Newcastle on the way to promotion to the First Division. There was a real chance of a treble this season.

February
Liverpool maintained top place in the First Division throughout February. In the League Cup semi-finals, they were held to a surprise 2–2 draw by Third Division minnows Walsall in the first leg at Anfield before winning the return leg 2–0 at Fellows Park, to secure a place in the League Cup final a month later against Merseyside rivals Everton, who were on a run in the cup competitions despite dismal league form which had seen repeated calls from fans for manager Howard Kendall to be sacked.

March
March saw Liverpool seal their first trophy of the season when they won 1–0 in the final replay at Maine Road on 28 March 1984, three days after the first game saw them draw 0–0 with Everton at Wembley Stadium. The European adventure resumed with an excellent 5-1 aggregate win over Portuguese champions Benfica. They were still going strong in the league as well, and by the end of March only Manchester United (two points behind them) were looking able to catch them.

April
A succession of wins could have wrapped up Liverpool's 15th league title before the end of April, but a shock defeat to relegation threatened Stoke City and a 3–3 draw with Leicester City meant that April ended with Liverpool still just two points ahead of Manchester United with four games remaining. And a late surge from QPR and Southampton suggested that the title might not end up at Anfield or Old Trafford.

Liverpool reached their fourth European Cup final by eliminating Dinamo Bucharest in the semi-finals.

May
May 1984 was one of the most glorious months ever experienced by Liverpool Football Club, but it began with a result that suggested the month could turn out to be one of the most disappointing. A goalless draw at relegation threatened Birmingham City (who soon went down thanks to a late escape act by Stoke City) could have been enough for Liverpool to lose their lead to Manchester United on goal difference, but Ron Atkinson's side also managed only a draw that weekend, and there was still a mathematical chance of either QPR or Southampton winning the title.

Two days after the scare in the midlands, another midland side – Coventry City – took on Liverpool, this time at Anfield. Any talk of a repeat of the December humiliation at Highfield Road was quickly silenced as the Reds crushed the Sky Blues 5-0 (with Ian Rush scoring four goals and pushing them to the edge of the relegation zone just five months after they had been pushing for the title) and opened up a five-point lead to a Manchester United side who were beaten by Nottingham Forest on the same day. Southampton were now the only side other than Manchester United who could catch Liverpool, but the Reds only needed two points from their final two games to be sure of the title.

Liverpool drew their penultimate league game of the season with doomed Notts County at Meadow Lane, but Manchester United and Southampton were only able to draw their games as well – meaning that Liverpool had become only the third English club to win three successive league titles.	

The championship trophy was presented to the club on 15 May 1984 after the final league game of the season – a 1–1 draw with Norwich City at Anfield.

The European Cup final was played on 30 May 1984. Veteran defender Phil Neal put the Reds ahead against AS Roma at the Stadio Olimpico in Rome, but the Italians later equalised to force a 1–1 draw which remained the score as full-time and then extra time loomed. The match went to a penalty shoot-out, which the Reds won 4–2, becoming the first English club to win three major trophies in the same season. It was their fourth European Cup triumph – a record only bettered by Real Madrid who won it six times between 1956 and 1966.

Squad

Goalkeepers
  Bob Bolder
  Bruce Grobbelaar

Defenders
  Jim Beglin
  Gary Gillespie
  Alan Hansen
  Alan Kennedy
  Mark Lawrenson
  John McGregor
  Phil Neal
  Steve Nicol
  Phil Thompson

Midfielders
  Craig Johnston
  Sammy Lee
  Graeme Souness
  John Wark
  Ronnie Whelan

Attackers
  Kenny Dalglish
  David Hodgson
  Michael Robinson
  Ian Rush

League table

Results

First Division

FA Charity Shield

FA Cup

League Cup

Final

Replay

European Cup

Final

References
LFC History.net – Games for the 1983–84 season
Liverweb - Games for the 1983–84 season

Liverpool F.C. seasons
Liverpool
UEFA Champions League-winning seasons
English football championship-winning seasons